Eva Gonzalès (April 19, 1849 – May 6, 1883) was a French Impressionist painter. She was one of the four most notable female Impressionists in the nineteenth century, along with Mary Cassatt (1844–1926), Berthe Morisot (1841–95), and Marie Bracquemond (1840–1916).

Early life
Eva Gonzalès was born in Paris and became introduced to sophisticated literary and art circles at an early age by her father, writer Emmanuel Gonzalès. In 1865, at age sixteen, Eva Gonzales began her professional training and art lessons in drawing from the society portraitist Charles Chaplin. Through her father's connections as a founding president of the Société des gens de lettres, she met a variety of members of the Parisian cultural elite, and from a young age was exposed to the new ideas surrounding art and literature at the time. Three years later she met Manet and soon became his model and then his student.

Student of Édouard Manet
Gonzalès is best known for her starting out as a pupil of the artist Édouard Manet in February 1869. This relationship was formed by poor reviews that Manet received about his Salon entries, which made him hesitant to openly discuss his work; however, something about Eva's presence brought Manet out of his shell. Manet is said to have begun a portrait of her at once, which was completed in March 1870 and exhibited as Mlle E.G. at the Paris Salon in that year. Unfortunately, her debut submissions to the Salon, also in 1870, were overshadowed by the presence of Manet's portrait. In the Portrait of Eva Gonzales, Manet depicts her working at an easel, yet her stiff posture and expensive dress are clearly unfit for creating artwork. This depiction of her likely caused some critics to perceive her simply as a young, decorative model who was working with an older established male painter. Gonzalès was Manet's only formal student and also modeled for several members of the Impressionist school. Manet's Mlle E.G. was discussed more than Gonzalès' oeuvre at her own 1885 retrospective and at the Galerie Daber's exhibition for her work in 1950.

Gonzales' style aligns very closely to that of Manet's Spanish period, slight changes were made through the years as her forms of art consisted of discipline with a sober palette. The subjects she chose to use, were a representation of everyday life, that was deeply transpired by being under Manet's guidance.

During 1871, Manet pursued the incorporation of the more brilliant colors and active surfaces of the Impressionists within his work. Meanwhile, Gonzales decided to retain the neutral color schemes and precise contours of the sixties, while leaving her pastels in softer tones that created a lighter palette for her to work with. Gonzales' work may not be regarded as innovative, but it still holds charm and a sense of sincere personal expression that gives it significant value. Despite her association of being one of Manet's student, her work still carries meaning and progressing in the direction that perfectly aligned with her temperament.

Career and later life
Gonzalès' work was celebrated by Salon reviewers for the inherent intuition with which she approached art, as well as her technical skill. At one point she listed herself as a student of Charles Chaplin with her submissions to the Salon, perhaps as a method to be taken more seriously. Much of her work became characterized through Salon reviews with the discussion of her "feminine technique" and her "seductive harmony." However, her large-scale painting, Box at the Théâtre des Italiens (1874), was characterized by the Salon jury as having "masculine vigor," which led them to reject it with questions as to her painting's authenticity. Nevertheless, her work was reviewed positively by a variety of critics. Louis Leroy, Jules Castagnary, and Émile Zola praised the work she successfully showed at the Salons. Furthermore, the art critic Maria Deraismes championed Gonzalés for producing paintings which challenged the way female painters were viewed and separated from the art scene in Paris.

Like Édouard Manet, Gonzalès never exhibited in the Impressionist exhibitions in Paris, but she is considered part of the group because of her painting style. While studying under Manet, Gonzalès' self-portraits suggest that she was exploring her individuality and identity as an artist by presenting subtle correctives to Manet's version of her. Until 1872, she was strongly influenced by Manet but later developed her own, more personal style. This can be seen in works such as Enfant de Troupe (1870), which is a nod to Manet's Le Fifre (1866), while many of her later paintings involved portraits of her sister, Jeanne. It was common of Gonzales to use her family members, particularly her husband and her sister, Jeanne Gonzalès, as models in her work.

In 1879, after a three-year engagement, she married Henri Guérard, a graphic artist and Manet's engraver. The couple had a son named Jean Raimond in April 1883, shortly before receiving news of the death of Manet. During the Franco-Prussian War she sought refuge in Dieppe.

Her work was exhibited at the offices of the art review L'Art in 1882 and at the Galerie Georges Petit in 1883. Today, one of Gonzales' most notable works is A Loge in the Théàtre des Italiens (1874) which is "described as one of the most provocative paintings of its day..."

Death
In 1883, Gonzelès died in childbirth at the age of thirty-four, five days after the death of her teacher, Edouard Manet, which left her son to be raised by his father and her sister, Jeanne, who later became Guerard's second wife. Since her death, exhibitions of Gonzales work were held at the Salons de La Vie Moderne (1885), the Salon d'Automne (1907), at several galleries in Paris. Her work has also been exhibited in 1952 at the Musée National des Beaux-Arts, Monte Carlo.

Accomplishments 
Eva Gonzales' paintings have been purchased by the French government along with private collectors. Out of all her works, the broadest representation of her oeuvre can be spotted in the collection of her son and his heirs.

Some other accomplishments that she has had throughout her career, include the newspaper L'Art purchasing her pastels and receiving recognition in England, Belgium, and France.

In the mid-1870s, Gonzalès started experimenting with pastels, which allowed her work to stand as finished pieces. They may be her most successful works, as she is a figure in the impressionist movement.

Before dying in childbirth at age 34, Gonzalès showed her work at a number of important group shows.

Bibliography 
Bayle, Paule, "Eva Gonzales," La Renaissance, June 1932.
Mathey, Francois, Six femmes peintres, Paris, 1951, 8.
Monaco, Eva Gonzales exposition, catalog by Claude Roger -Marx, 1952.
Moreau- Nelaton, E.., Manet raconte par luimeme, Paris, 1926, I.
Paris, Salons de la Vie Moderne, Catalogue des peinntures et pastels de Eva Gonzales, preface by Philippe Burty, essay by Theodore de Banville, 1885.
Paris, Galerie Bernheim- Jeune, Eva Gonzales, 1914.
Paris, Galerie Marcel Bernheim, Eva Gonzales, exposition retrospective, catalog by Paul Bayle, 1932.
Paris, Galerie Daber, Eva Gonzales retrospective, catalog by Alfred Daber, 1959.
Roger-Marx, Claude, Eva Gonzales, short essay by Theodore de Banville, Paris, 1950.
Little Soldier

Exhibitions:

Salon of 1870: Eva Gonzales retrospective,
Galerire Daber, Paris, 1959.

Literature:

Karl Berrand, " Salon de 1870," L' artiste,
April–June 1870, 319; Roger-Marx, n.p.,
Rewald, 240-41 and note 4, 268; Genevieve Lacambre and Jacqueline Rohan-Chabot, Le Musee de Luxembourg en 1874, Paris, 1974.

Gallery

Selected exhibitions

References

Eva Gonzalès paintings, Bio, ideas. The Art Story. (n.d.). Retrieved October 14, 2022, from https://www.theartstory.org/artist/gonzales-eva/

Further reading
Marie-Caroline Sainsaulieu and Jacques de Mons. Eva Gonzalès: 1849–1883: Étude critique et catalogue raisonné. Paris, 1990.
Marianne Delafond. Les femmes impressionnistes: Mary Cassatt, Eva Gonzalès, Berthe Morisot. Paris. 1993. .
Nochlin, Linda and Harris- Sutherland, Ann . Women Artists 1550–1950 pg 246–248.
Elisabeth Jacquet. Eva Gonzalès/Rencontre avec une jeune femme moderne, L’Atelier Contemporain, 2020

External links
Olga's Gallery
Spaightwood Galleries

1849 births
1883 deaths
Burials at Montmartre Cemetery
19th-century French painters
French people of Spanish descent
French women painters
French Impressionist painters
Painters from Paris
Deaths in childbirth
French artists' models
19th-century French women artists